Dothan City Schools is a school district in Houston County, Alabama. The district is governed by the Dothan City Board of Education. As of 2022, the system includes 9 elementary schools, 3 middle schools, 2 high schools (9th Grade Academy/10-12 Grade High School), an alternative school, and a technology center.

Schools

High Schools
Accelerated Recovery Center
Dothan High School/Carver 9th Grade Academy
Dothan Technology Center

Middle Schools
Beverlye Intermediate School
Dothan Preparatory Academy
Girard Intermediate School

Elementary Schools
Carver School for Math, Science & Technology
Girard Elementary School
Heard Elementary School
Hidden Lake Primary School
Highlands Elementary School
Jerry Lee Faine Elementary School
Kelly Springs Elementary School
Morris Slingluff Elementary School
Selma St. Elementary School

References

External links
 

Dothan, Alabama
School districts in Alabama